Prince Anusara Siroprasadh or Phra Chao Boromwongse Ther Phra Ong Chao Anusara Siriprasadh (RTGS: Anusorn Siriprasarth) (21 February 1891 – 6 May 1900), was the Prince of Siam (later Thailand). He was a son of Chulalongkorn, King Rama V of Siam and a member of the Siamese Royal Family.

His mother was The Noble Consort (Chao Chom Manda) Mom Rajawongse Kesara Sanidvongse, daughter of Mom Chao Savasdi Sanidvongse. He had an elder full brother, Prince Isariyabhorn.

Prince Anusara Siriprasadh died in childhood on 6 May 1900, at the age of 9 years 3 months.

Ancestry

1891 births
1900 deaths
19th-century Thai people
Thai male Phra Ong Chao
Children of Chulalongkorn
19th-century Thai royalty who died as children
19th-century Chakri dynasty
Sons of kings